John Christopher Gall (born April 2, 1978) is an American former Major League Baseball left fielder who played for the St. Louis Cardinals and Florida Marlins from 2005 to 2007.

College
After the 1997 season, he played collegiate summer baseball with the Orleans Cardinals of the Cape Cod Baseball League. His best college year was as a sophomore in which he had a team-leading .381 batting average and 63 RBI, with 15 home runs, second only to former Padres outfielder Jody Gerut on the team. However, Gall elected to return to college for his senior year, and was eventually selected by the St. Louis Cardinals in the 11th round of the  draft. He played in 3 College World Series and was All-Tournament Team in 1999 while hitting .611. He is the All-Time Pac-12 leader in hits and RBI's.

Professional career
After a season at Single-A ball, Gall played the  season for the New Haven Ravens, the Double-A affiliate of the Cardinals at the time. Here he hit 20 home runs and 81 RBI with a .316 batting average.

On July 26, after a promising start to the  season in Memphis, Gall was promoted for the first time to the major league roster, to replace Larry Walker, who was on the disabled list. In his debut against the San Diego Padres at Petco Park, Gall proceeded to go 2-for-4 with a double. He was sent back down to Memphis eight games later on August 9 having collected four hits, two doubles, and two RBI in his first stint as a major-leaguer. After another call-up, he was placed on the active roster for the 2005 Cardinal's playoff team. On July 17, the Cardinals released Gall and he signed with the Lotte Giants in Korea. Gall received a World Series ring for his stint with the St Louis Cardinals in 2006. He signed with the Florida Marlins on January 4, . Gall spent much of the year with the Marlins Triple-A affiliate, the Albuquerque Isotopes, with a stint with the Florida Marlins.

Gall was named to the United States national baseball team for the 2008 Olympics in Beijing. Gall's success in the olympics, most notably for his home run over Taiwan which helped the United States get to the Bronze Medal round, got recognized by notable people including an appearance on The Oprah Winfrey Show, an invitation to the White House and serving as a guest of honor for California Governor, Arnold Schwarzenegger.

In January , Gall signed a minor league contract with the Houston Astros. His last professional season was 2009. Gall also won a Liga del Pacifico Championship for the Venados de Mazatlan in 2005.

Personal life 
Gall currently resides in the Bay Area with his family. He is the cousin of former Arizona Diamondbacks and Seattle Mariners outfielder Eric Byrnes.

References

External links

1978 births
Living people
Baseball players from California
Major League Baseball outfielders
New Jersey Cardinals players
Peoria Chiefs players
New Haven Ravens players
Tennessee Smokies players
St. Louis Cardinals players
Stanford Cardinal baseball players
Orleans Firebirds players
Florida Marlins players
KBO League outfielders
American expatriate baseball players in South Korea
Lotte Giants players
Memphis Redbirds players
Albuquerque Isotopes players
Baseball players at the 2008 Summer Olympics
Olympic bronze medalists for the United States in baseball
Medalists at the 2008 Summer Olympics
People from Stanford, California